K.R.C. Mechelen is a Belgian association football club from Mechelen in the Antwerp province. It is a long-time rival of KV Mechelen. The club's best position ever is a second place in the first division 1951–52. KRC Mechelen also reached the final of the Belgian Cup in 1954. However, the team has been falling through the Belgian football league system since 2015 and in the 2017–18 season it will be playing in the Belgian Provincial Leagues for the first time since 1906.

History
Founded in July 1904 as Racing Club de Malines, the club registered with the federation two years later on 22 June 1906 and received the matricule n°24. The name of the club changed three times: first the suffix Société Royale was added (1929), then the name was translated into Dutch becoming Koninklijke Racing Club Mechelen (1937).

Racing Mechelen played its first season in the first division in 1910–11 and finished 8th of 12 teams. By this time, rival FC Malines, later called KV Mechelen, was playing in second division. The following season, Racing ended 11th just one point away from Beerschot and was relegated. Just before World War I, Racing finished second in their division while FC Malines was third (8 points away). Thus RC Malines were promoted, playing the following season in the first division, which was played in 1919–20. They ended in 6th place. Two years after that FC Malines was playing in the first division too. In 1929 and 1930 after having spent one year in the second division (1924), the club grabbed third place in the first division. A record it would beat in 1952 with a second place after a new sequence of two third places (1950 and 1951). In 1954 it qualified for the final game of the Belgian Cup. Afterwards, the club fell to the second division and has rarely played at a higher level in recent decades.

Stadium

The Oscar Vankesbeeckstadion is a football stadium in the Belgian city of Mechelen. The stadium is located just to the north of the centre of town over the River Dijle. It was built in 1923 and is named after the former president of the club: Oscar Van Kesbeeck (1886–1943) who was a Flemish Liberal Politician. The current capacity of the stadium is 6,123. The Oscar Vankesbeeckstadion is located just under a mile away from Argosstadion Achter de Kazerne, which is home to rivals KV Mechelen.

Honours
Belgian First Division:
Runners-up (1): 1951–52
Third place (4): 1928–29, 1929–30, 1949–50, 1950–51
Belgian Second Division:
Winners (4): 1909–10, 1947–1948, 1974–1975, 1987–1988
Runners-up (5): 1913–1914, 1924–1925, 1938–1939, 1945–1946, 1984–1985
Belgian Third Division:
Winners (4): 1961–1962, 1965–1966, 1968–1969, 2013–2014
Belgian Cup:
Runners-up (1): 1953–1954

Current squad

On loan

Managers

References

External links
 Official website

 
Football clubs in Belgium
Association football clubs established in 1904
1904 establishments in Belgium
K.R.C. Mechelen
Organisations based in Belgium with royal patronage
Belgian Pro League clubs